GlobaLogix is an oilfield engineering and technology company, operating in Houston, Texas. It offers several services related to the industry, from remote data management and collection to automation consultation.

History
Incorporated in 2004, GlobaLogix was created to resolve the problem of limited technological resources and rising price rates. A demand for better asset management drove GlobaLogix to create a service that allows for remote observation and data collection of oilfields.

In 2007, the Houston Business Journal named GlobaLogix the fastest growning company in Houston. Sales from 2006 to 2007 rose 1,400 percent from $347,000 to $5,017,000, outpacing all other technology company growth in the Houston area. Growth continued in 2008 and again in 2009 with a posted 90%+ growth in revenue. Headcount of the staff passed the 100 mark in 2009 and in early 2010 was more than 115.

GlobaLogix's vice president, Jim Ferrero, announced in 2010 that GlobaLogix would provide consultation to companies considering transitioning to more carbon-neutral operations. These consultations would provide evaluations and suggestions for more efficient automation of the industry, as well as a movement towards more digital management.

Services
GlobaLogix offers multiple services to clients, including wireless, satellite, radio, Wi-Fi, supervisory control and data acquisition or SCADA, human-machine interface, and programmable logic controllers. They also provide consulting services, which include evaluating current oilfield operations and assisting clients in implementing automated systems that incorporate existing equipment.

The company employs engineers, programmers, and information technology managers to handle the technical side of its project operations, and also maintains a staff of traditional field technicians for labor in the oilfields.

GlobaLogix's mission is to help companies achieve greener operations in their oil and natural gas fields by using predictive maintenance to address field problems, avoid shutdowns, and reduce the number of miles driven each day by field personnel.

News
InTech Magazine: Leveraging predictive maintenance to achieve greener field operations
Digital Energy Journal: Automating Your Fields
Digital Energy Journal: Linking SCADA Development with Operational Needs
Houston Business Journal: Drumming up Business, Trojan Horse Style
Remote Site & Equipment Management
American Oil & Gas Reporter

References

Geology software
Business software companies